Marie P. Dechman is a Canadian politician. She represented the electoral district of Lunenburg West in the Nova Scotia House of Assembly from 1988 to 1993. She was a member of the Progressive Conservative Party of Nova Scotia.

Political career
Dechman entered provincial politics in the 1988 election, winning the Lunenburg West riding by 268 votes. In 1989, she was elected Nova Scotia's first woman Deputy Speaker. In February 1991, Dechman was appointed to the Executive Council of Nova Scotia as Minister of Community Services. On February 17, 1992, she was shuffled to Minister of Counsumer Affairs, and Minister responsible for Housing, which were later merged into one position, Minister of Housing and Consumer Affairs. In the 1993 election, Dechman was defeated by Liberal Don Downe.

References

Living people
Progressive Conservative Association of Nova Scotia MLAs
Members of the Executive Council of Nova Scotia
People from Lunenburg County, Nova Scotia
Women MLAs in Nova Scotia
Women government ministers of Canada
1941 births